FannyAnn Viola Eddy (1974 – 29 September 2004) was an activist for lesbian and gay rights in her native Sierra Leone and throughout Africa. In 2002, she founded the Sierra Leone Lesbian and Gay Association, the first of its kind in Sierra Leone. She traveled widely, addressing the United Nations and other international groups. In April 2004, she advocated the passing of the Brazilian Resolution at the UN in Geneva.

Death
Eddy was murdered on September 29, 2004, when a group of at least three men broke into the office of the Sierra Leone Lesbian and Gay Association in central Freetown, gang-raped her, stabbed her, and eventually broke her neck.

Eddy left behind a 10-year-old son and a girlfriend Esther Chikalipa.

Legacy
The Hirschfeld Eddy Foundation, a human rights foundation for lesbians and gays, was named for her and Magnus Hirschfeld.

In 2008, the FannyAnn Eddy Poetry Award was named in her honour.

See also
 Violence against LGBT people

References

External links
 Testimony by FannyAnn Eddy at the U.N. Commission on Human Rights
 "Testimony by Fannyann Eddy at the U.N. Commission on Human Rights", Website Dedication.

1974 births
2004 deaths
Assassinated activists
Corrective rape
Lesbians
Lesbophobic violence
Sierra Leonean LGBT people
Sierra Leonean LGBT rights activists
People murdered in Sierra Leone
Sierra Leone Creole people
Sierra Leonean murder victims
Victims of anti-LGBT hate crimes
20th-century LGBT people
Violence against women in Sierra Leone